John Lind (March 25, 1854 – September 18, 1930) was an American politician from Minnesota. He served as the 14th Governor of Minnesota from 1899 to 1901 and represented the state in the United States Congress for four terms. Lind also played an important role in the Mexican Revolution as an envoy for President Woodrow Wilson.

Early life and career
Lind was born on March 25, 1854 in Kånna, Kronoberg County in the Swedish province of Småland. When he was thirteen years old, he emigrated to the United States with his parents. He worked as a teacher and superintendent before graduating from the University of Minnesota Law School.

Lind settled in New Ulm to practice law. Most of the inhabitants were German, but Lind adjusted by learning to speak German almost as fluently as he could Swedish. He was soon known among the lawyers across the ninth circuit.

He joined the Republican party almost as soon as he set up his office; most Swedes made the same choice in Minnesota.  While he could not yet vote in the 1872 presidential election, he stood at the polls to hand out ballots. Party loyalty brought the usual rewards: a receivership in the United States Land Office in 1881, and 1886 a Republican nomination to Congress. Lind was so devoted to his law practice that in the very convention that first nominated him to Congress, he left before proceedings had closed to attend to a client in the court down at Lincoln County.

United States Representative 
Lind was no great orator, but he had special advantages. His district was Republican, generally by a two-to-one margin. The Swedish vote was dependably in favor of Lind, as well, and so were the Germans in New Ulm, thanks to his wide professional acquaintanceship with them. Farmers also resented the duty on binding-twine in the protective tariff, and ran as a moderate tariff revisionist. His support for placing lumber on the duty-free list was far more popular within his district than in the lumber-producing regions in the north of the state. Concerned over the destruction of the nation's forests and a strong supporter for the national timber-culture law, he hoped that a larger importation of foreign lumber would slacken the timber companies' appetite for American trees.

Lind served as a Republican in the United States House of Representatives from March 4, 1887 to March 3, 1893 in the 50th, 51st, and 52nd congresses. As a member of the House Commerce Committee, he handled all the bills dealing with bridge construction in the Northwest and stood fast against monopoly privileges. Any railroad company authorized to span a river would have to guarantee free use by every other railroad, in return for reasonable compensation. Lind offered an anti-trust bill of his own, forbidding railroads from carrying any of the so-called patent cars—those like the oil-cars that Standard Oil built, or the refrigerator cars that the meat-packers designed—that could not be furnished to all shippers at equal and fair rates.  Even when he supported the McKinley protective tariff, the highest in history, he made himself conspicuous trying to cut the rates on jute-bagging for small shippers and in his fight against a seven hundred percent hike in the protection given to binding-twine manufacturers. In 1890, when the Farmers' Alliances were defeating other Minnesota Republican congressmen, Lind survived re-election challenges.

Lind chose not to continue in the House.  His law practice had been neglected, and, with no independent means, he found it better to announce his retirement at the end of the Fifty-Second Congress.

Governor of Minnesota 

Lind served in the Spanish–American War in 1898.

Lind also served in the United States House of Representatives from March 4, 1903, to March 3, 1905, as a Democrat. When he was elected Governor of Minnesota, he was the first non-Republican to hold that office in forty years.

Lind did not withdraw from politics entirely, and was considered for the Republican nomination for governor in 1892, but was conspicuously uninterested. Four years later, however, he ran for governor as a Democrat. He lost but Minnesota remained a firmly Republican state.

In 1898, Lind ran again and was elected with the endorsement of the Populists and Silver Republicans. He served as the 14th Governor of Minnesota from January 2, 1899, to January 7, 1901.

Mexican Revolution
On March 4, 1913, Woodrow Wilson was sworn in as President of the United States briefly after the February 22 assassination of Mexican President Francisco I. Madero and Vice President José María Pino Suárez. It soon became clear that U.S. Ambassador Henry Lane Wilson was complicit in the plot.

General Victoriano Huerta was now president of Mexico, and Wilson and Secretary of State William Jennings Bryan immediately sent Lind to Mexico as  Envoy for Mexican Affairs. Lind had financial interests in Mexico and had long-standing ties with other U.S. landholders.

Lind attempted to persuade Huerta to call prompt elections and not stand as a candidate in them, but Huerta refused. Lind "threatened a military intervention by the United States in case the demands were rejected," but promised an American loan to Mexico if Huerta stepped aside. When rebellions broke against the Huerta regime, Lind backed Venustiano Carranza, a large landowner and former Governor of Coahuila, and his Constitutionalist faction against more radical elements in the rebellion, mainly Constitutionalist Army general Pancho Villa.

Personal life
Lind was known for having a temper. According to an article on the front page of the Moose Lake (Minnesota) Star on January 17, 1901: "Ex-governor John Lind after having freed himself from the duties of the governor last Thursday walked down to the Dispatch office in St. Paul and administered to Editor Black a well-deserved licking. For a one-armed man, John Lind can make some telling blows once in a while."

Death 
He died in 1930 in Minneapolis, Minnesota.

See also
List of U.S. state governors born outside the United States

References

External links

 John Lind house at the City of Minneapolis website.
 John Lind photographs at the Hennepin County Library.
 John Lind photographs at the Minnesota Historical Society.

 Biographical information, his  gubernatorial records, and personal papers are available for research use at the Minnesota Historical Society.

1854 births
1930 deaths
People from Ljungby Municipality
Swedish emigrants to the United States
American Unitarians
Governors of Minnesota
People from New Ulm, Minnesota
People of the Spanish–American War
University of Minnesota Law School alumni
Republican Party members of the United States House of Representatives from Minnesota
Democratic Party members of the United States House of Representatives from Minnesota
Democratic Party governors of Minnesota